A list of Spanish-produced and co-produced feature films released in Spain in 1996. The domestic theatrical release date is favoured.

Films

Box office 
The ten highest-grossing Spanish films in 1996, by domestic box office gross revenue, are as follows:

See also 
 11th Goya Awards

References

External links
 Spanish films of 1996 at the Internet Movie Database

1996
Spanish
Films